Sabrina Soravilla Calvano (born 25 August 1996) is a Uruguayan footballer who plays as a midfielder for Liverpool FC (Montevideo) and the Uruguay women's national team.

International career
Soravilla represented Uruguay at the 2012 FIFA U-17 Women's World Cup along with her twin Romina. At senior level, she played in two Copa América Femenina editions (2014 and 2018).

References 

1996 births
Living people
Women's association football midfielders
Uruguayan women's footballers
People from Canelones Department
Uruguay women's international footballers
Club Nacional de Football players
Liverpool F.C. (Montevideo) players
Twin sportspeople
Uruguayan twins